Barna is both a surname and a given name. Notable people with the name include:

Surname:
 Adriana Barna, Romanian-German tennis player
 Anca Barna, Romanian-German tennis player
 Babe Barna, American baseball player
 Dan Barna, Romanian politician and lawyer
 Daniel Barna, Romanian football player
 Dillon Barna, American soccer player
 George Barna, Christian sociologist
 József Braun (also known as József Barna; 1901–1943), Hungarian Olympic footballer 
 Laszlo Barna, Hungarian-Canadian television producer
 Petr Barna, Czech figure skater
 Viktor Barna, Hungarian and British table tennis player

Given name:
 Barna Bor, Hungarian judoka
 Barna Buza, Hungarian politician and jurist
 Barna Kabay, Hungarian film director, screenwriter and film producer
 Barna da Siena, Sienese painter

Slavic-language surnames
Romanian-language surnames